Nogometni klub Krka, commonly referred to as NK Krka or Krka, is a Slovenian football club based in Novo Mesto that competes in the Slovenian Second League, the second tier of Slovenian football. The team play its home games at Portoval. The club was founded in 1922 and was known as NK Elan 1922 in the past.

Supporters
Krka supporters are called Trotters Novo mesto. They were established in 1988.

Honours
Slovenian Second League
Winners: 1991–92

Slovenian Third League
Winners: 1996–97, 2006–07, 2011–12

MNZ Ljubljana Cup
Winners: 1996–97, 1999–2000, 2010–11, 2012–13

League history since 1991

See also
ŽNK Krka, women's team

References

External links
Official website 
PrvaLiga profile 
Soccerway profile

 
Association football clubs established in 1922
Sport in Novo Mesto
Football clubs in Yugoslavia
Football clubs in Slovenia
1922 establishments in Slovenia